The 1989 Rice Owls football team was an American football team that represented Rice University in the Southwest Conference during the 1989 NCAA Division I-A football season. In their first year under head coach Fred Goldsmith, the team compiled a 2–8–1 record.

Schedule

References

Rice
Rice Owls football seasons
Rice Owls football